Johnielle Keith "Kit" Pasion Nieto (born January 31, 1969) is a Filipino lawyer and politician who last served as the Mayor of Cainta from 2013 until 2022. He ran for mayoralty during 2013 elections under United Nationalist Alliance and was proclaimed winner, beating Veron Ilagan, wife of former Mayor Mon Ilagan. He ran again during 2016 elections and 2019 elections under Nationalist People's Coalition and won landslide victories, beating incumbent vice-mayor Sofia Velasco in the latter one.

Early life and career
Johnielle Keith is the son of Rolando Nieto and Ethelyn Pasion (both medical doctors) with five siblings.  His mother was also an undersecretary of the Department of Health, while his brother Jan is a recording artist who competed on Philippine Idol. His other brother Jet was a member of the 1987 and 1988 Ateneo Blue Eagles championship teams.

Nieto graduated from the Ateneo de Manila University with a Bachelor of Arts degree in political science. He attended the Ateneo School of Law for his law degree and was admitted to the bar  on March 15, 1994 with Roll No. 39119.

Nieto is the uncle and godfather of professional basketball players, Matt and Mike Nieto, who both played for the Ateneo Blue Eagles until 2019.

References

1969 births
20th-century Filipino lawyers
Living people
Mayors of places in Rizal
People from Cainta
Nationalist People's Coalition politicians
United Nationalist Alliance politicians
Ateneo de Manila University alumni